Daniel Betancourth (born November 16, 1980, in Guayaquil) is an Ecuadorian singer. He came to prominence in 2007. He is also known as Daniel Beta.

References

Living people
1980 births
21st-century Ecuadorian male singers